Ida Waterman (born Ida Shaw; March 10, 1852 – May 22, 1941) was a stage and screen actress.

Waterman was born in Philadelphia, Pennsylvania. She appeared some thirty or more Broadway productions between the late 1880s and early 1920s. She played Elise Claremont in the 1889 farce-comedy Our Flat and the following year Mrs. Kirke in Men and Women opposite Maude Adams. In 1899 she was Mrs. Crawley in Becky Sharp (later made into 1934 film Becky Sharp) and in 1922 closed out her Broadway career playing Mrs. French in Lawful Larceny.

Waterman was popular in numerous silent films in the teens and twenties as a supporting elderly actress much like Kate Lester. After decades of being a Victorian and Edwardian stage actress, Waterman moved into silent films in the 1910s. She died in 1941 in Cincinnati, Ohio.

Selected filmography
The Eagle's Mate (1914)
Behind the Scenes (1914)
Aristocracy (1914)
Are You a Mason? (1915)
The Ringtailed Rhinoceros (1915)
Esmerelda (1915)
Stella Maris (1918)
Amarilly of Clothes-Line Alley (1918)
Mr. Fix-It (1918)
Sadie Love (1919)
A Misfit Earl (1919)
Counterfeit (1919)
Lure of Ambition (1919)
On with the Dance (1920)
Lady Rose's Daughter (1920)
Her Lord and Master (1921)
The Inner Chamber (1921)
The Lotus Eater (1921)
Love's Redemption (1921)
 Her Lord and Master (1921)
 Notoriety (1922)
A Society Scandal (1924)
The Enchanted Cottage (1924)
The Swan (1925)
That Royle Girl (1925)
A Social Celebrity (1926)
Say It Again (1926)

References

External links

portrait of Ida Waterman
Ida Waterman in scene from motion picture Lady Rose's Daughter 1920 with Elsie Ferguson and David Powell
Ida Waterman with Alice Joyce in "The Inner Chamber" (1921)

1852 births
1941 deaths
Actresses from Philadelphia
American silent film actresses
19th-century American actresses
American stage actresses
20th-century American actresses